Peter Polgár (born 20 June 1976 in Bratislava) is a Slovak football defender who ended his career after a match with Spartak Trnava  . His former club was ŠK Slovan Bratislava.

External links
at sfmsenec.eu 
at imscouting.com

References

1976 births
Living people
Association football central defenders
Slovak footballers
ŠK Slovan Bratislava players
FK Inter Bratislava players
Zalaegerszegi TE players
Slovak Super Liga players
ŠK Senec players
People from Senec, Slovakia
Sportspeople from the Bratislava Region